The law of Gibraltar is a combination of common law 
and statute, and is based heavily upon English law.

The English Law (Application) Act 1962 stipulates that English common law will apply to Gibraltar unless overridden by Gibraltar law. However, as Gibraltar is a self-governing British overseas territory, it maintains its own independent tax status and its parliament can enact laws independently of the United Kingdom.

See also
Court system of Gibraltar

External links
 Gibraltar's Law & Justice System
 Searchable database of the laws of Gibraltar

 
Self-governance